Animals Drawn from Nature and Engraved in Aqua-tinta is a book written and illustrated by Charles Catton the younger and published in London in 1788. It is a very early example of a work including hand-coloured aquatints. The thirty-six animals described, all mammals except for the crocodile, were from both the New World and the Old World. At the time Catton had not travelled abroad so he drew native British animals as well as exotics kept in captivity in Britain.

Background
Catton was by profession an artist who was taught his skills by his father, also called Charles Catton, who is known in the history of art as Charles Catton the elder.

Charles Catton the elder

The elder Catton (1728–1798) was apprenticed to a coach builder at a time when it was fashionable to have heraldic coats of arms painted on the sides of the coaches. He became skilled in the artistic part of his trade and was well known for his ability at painting animals supporting coats of arms in a naturalistic way rather than heraldically. As well as becoming coach painter to George III he became an accomplished portraitist and a founder member of the Royal Academy.

Charles Catton the younger's art

Charles Catton the younger (1756–1819) was apprenticed to his father, working closely to his style, and was trained at the Royal Academy schools. He exhibited regularly at the academy (1775–1800) – landscapes, animals and topographical watercolours – and was an occasional scene painter at Covent Garden Theatre (1781–1794). He toured Great Britain making paintings and sketches, many of which were later engraved by others but he was a skilled engraver himself. He did not leave Britain until he emigrated to the United States in 1804.

Shortly after "Animals" was published he contributed some illustrations for John White's 1790 Journal of a Voyage to New South Wales.

Publication

Animals was first published in 1788 in London by I. and J. Taylor and then again in 1825 in New Haven by H. Howe, a local bookseller and publisher. Thirty-six animals are described, each having a whole-page illustration and a page of text – 74 pages in all. The text and most of the illustrations are orientated sideways so the pages are in landscape format.
The binding is calfskin with gilt embellishments and the spine is in seven panels with a morocco leather title label in the second panel. The endpapers are with spot and veined marbling.

The Österreichische Nationalbibliothek in Vienna has placed page images of its first edition online. The book is also hosted on the Internet Archive. and a proofread text version is on Wikisource at Animals drawn from Nature and engraved in aqua-tinta.

In the first edition the aquatints are coloured and, according to Sarah Prideaux (1909)  

The "thick yellow varnish" referred to by Prideaux is very evident in the scan available. An example of the American 1825 edition is described as having its images uncoloured.

When describing prints, "hand-coloured" means that a monochrome print has been painted afterwards. This is to be distinguished from "colour-printed" which means that the printing itself was in colour. Colour printing could be produced either by painting the plate carefully with differently coloured inks and then making a single pressing, or by making a number of plates, engraved appropriately for each colour, and making sequential impressions. These techniques may be combined in a single illustration. An example of the British 1788 edition of Animals is described as having "hand-coloured aquatint plates by and after Catton, heightened with white and gum arabic." meaning that the illustrations were coloured afterwards and the reference to gum arabic further suggests that this what is meant. According to Baynton-Williams (1990)

Reception
In 1791 the book was on sale for £3 17s 0d and £9 5s 0d (£) if the plates were coloured, but by 1831 the inclusive price was only £3 13s 6d (£) with the recommendation "Catton was an eminent coach-painter and a very superior draftsman. The above work is scarce in any state, but particularly so in colours and varnish, in which state the plates have the appearance of oil paintings." In 2006 a British first edition sold at Christie's for £3,600 ($6,401 then) and in 2016 an American edition sold for $1,845 (£1,494 then).

Before Catton's book had been published, Thomas Bewick, who had been preparing his own book with monochrome woodcut engravings, A General History of Quadrupeds (1790), got into "a pitch of nervous curiosity" about the forthcoming competition. However, when he saw Catton's work he thought the prints were feeble and the book was considerably overpriced – when "Quadrupeds" was published in 1790 it was "greeted with delight". What Catton had called an "animal of the bear kind" (and what is now known as a sloth bear) made its appearance in Bewick's second, 1791, edition of "Quadrupeds" although it was not named in any way. At the end of the 18th century it was controversial whether this creature was a bear-like sloth or a sloth-like bear and the matter was still worthy of comment in Richard Owen's 1833 Zoological Magazine where Bewick is praised but Catton is given a slightly adverse review:

Bewick's engravings in Quadrupeds were not beyond all criticism. Bewick's brother John was dealing with the publishers and wrote to Thomas:

To remedy this sorry situation Bewick cut out part of his wood block and inserted a new piece of wood so that he could engrave a tail.

Animals included

Despite the title of Catton's book the animals were not all drawn from nature and not even from life as his individual texts sometimes acknowledge.

Identifications of animals

Catton did not use Linnaean taxonomy and his descriptions were those of an artist experienced in careful observation, not of an experienced naturalist. Hence, except when he uses the same name as is extant (even if rather archaic), this section records what experienced naturalists have later claimed are the specific identifications (sometimes from first-hand knowledge) or what Catton himself said were other naturalists' identifications. No attempt is made here to make identifications based on Catton's physical or behavioural descriptions, or from his illustrations.

Plate 1 and Plate 2. The Lion and Lioness – Panthera leo, the only species of lion.
Plate 3. The Tiger – Panthera tigris.
Plate 4. The Hunting Leopard – Panthera pardus.
Plate 5. The Tiger Cat – Catton says this is Buffon's ocelot, Felis pardalis, now Leopardus pardalis.
Plate 6. The Civet Cat –  many possible species of civet.
Plate 7. The Persian Lynx – Catton says "The Turks call it Karrah-Kulak", hence caracal, Caracal caracal.
Plate 8. The Persian Cat, (illustration labelled "Angora Catts") – Angora cat breed of Felis catus.
Plate 9. The Yellow Bear – "Among Mr Catton's figures of quadrupeds a representation is given of a yellow bear from the living animal then kept in the Tower" is in Hart Merriam's description of "The Yellow Bear of Louisiana, Ursus luteolus Griffith", now Ursus americanus luteolus.

Plate 10. Animal of the Bear Kind – George Shaw said Catton was "an artist who has been peculiarly happy in expressing the appearance of the animal". Shaw identified Catton's Petre bear as an "Ursine Sloth", or Bradypus Ursinus, now Melursus ursinus or sloth bear.

Plate 11. The Swedish Elk – Alces alces, in Britain the elk is what in America is called a moose.
Plate 12. The Antelope – Catton regards antelope as a "class" or "tribe" of mammals, not a species.
Plate 13. The White-Footed Antelope – still an alternative name for Boselaphus tragocamelus or Nilgai.
Plate 14. The Musk Deer – one of the several species of musk deer.
Plate 15. The Mouflon – mouflon is a type of wild sheep, Ovis orientalis.
Plate 16. The Angora Goat, the angora goat is a breed of domestic goat, species Capra aegagrus.
Plate 17. The Hyæna – Catton refers to Buffon, who was describing Canis hyaena, now Hyaena hyaena, the striped hyaena.
Plate 18. The Wolf – it was Canis lupus that was extirpated in Britain.
Plate 19. The Otaheite Dog – Tahitian Dog ("Otaheite" is Tahiti).
Plate 20. The Baboon – Catton's section heading "The Great Baboon" refers to what at the time was regarded as a species of baboon, the Mandrill Baboon, now Mandrillus sphinx.
Plate 21. The Lion Monkey – the Lion monkey, a lion tamarin of genus Leontopithecus.
Plate 22. The Child of the Sun – at the time also called the "Arabian Savage", suggested to be a hamadryas baboon. It was at the Exeter Exchange at a time when Thomas Clark was there (1773–1793). In any case it was genus Papio.
Plate 23. The Maucauco – Lemur catta.
Plate 24. The Ermine – Mustela erminea.
Plate 25. Animal of the Weasel Kind – Shaw suggests Catton's illustration is of a variety of Viverra putorius Linnaeus, now Spilogale putorius, the eastern spotted skunk.

Plate 26. The Coti – Catton says this is Buffon's Le Coati noiratre, which was Linnaeus' Viverra nasua, now nasua nasua. However, Buffon's other species, Coati Brun, is implied by Catton calling it "The Brown Coti" which was Linnaeus' Viverra narica, now Nasua narica.

Plate 27. The Badger – Meles meles.
Plate 28. The Otter – Lutra lutra.
Plate 29. The Beaver – describing Castor canadensis, the North American beaver. The Eurasian beaver had been extirpated in Britain by then.
Plate 30. The Glutton – Gulo gulo, wolverine.
Plate 31. The Armadillo – Catton describes the armadillo generally.
Plate 32. The Bombay Squirrel – if Catton is referring merely to a colour variation from Pennant's squirrel (rather than suggesting a different species) then Ratufa indica, the Indian giant squirrel, has been proposed.
Plate 33. The Peccary – species of peccary unidentifiable.
Plate 34. The Porcupine – Hystrix cristata was Sparrman's crested porcupine; maybe also describing Old World porcupines more broadly.
Plate 35. The Hippopotamus – Hippopotamus amphibius.
Plate 36. The Crocodile – Crocodylus niloticus'', Nile crocodile, and crocodiles generally.

Naturalists and others mentioned
This is a partial list of people mentioned in the book.

Sir Joseph Banks – Joseph Banks
"Mr. Brook's Menagerie" – Joshua Brookes (or Brooke) had a famous menagerie in London
Mr. Buffon – Georges-Louis Leclerc, Comte de Buffon
Captain Cook – Captain James Cook.
Mr. Gmelin – Either Johann Friedrich Gmelin or his uncle Johann Georg Gmelin the discoverer of the musk deer.
Hernandez – Francisco Hernández de Toledo
Kaempfer – Engelbert Kaempfer
Kolben – Peter Kolbe
Mr. Parkinson – James Parkinson (1730–1813), set up his museum in 1786 when he bought up the contents of the Leverean museum when Sir Ashton Lever went bankrupt
Mr. Pennant – Thomas Pennant
Mr. Shaw – George Shaw
Mr. Sparman – Anders Sparrman

Other relevant material
The University of Delaware has information on coloured printing and colour printing.

Illustrations from a different example of the 1788 edition, once owned by the Duke of Gloucester.

Notes

External links

References

English non-fiction books
1788 non-fiction books
Zoology books
Illustrated books